John William McCartan (born August 5, 1935) is a retired goaltender for the gold medal-winning 1960 United States ice hockey team. He is also a member of the United States Hockey Hall of Fame, inducted in 1983.

McCartan was born in Saint Paul, Minnesota. He was a college standout at the University of Minnesota from 1955 to 1958. McCartan also played baseball at Minnesota. McCartan was named First Team All-America after the 1957–1958 season. He played for the bronze medal-winning US team in baseball at the 1959 Pan American Games. After graduating, he joined the U.S. Army. While in the army, he joined the United States Olympic hockey team. His heroics helped the U.S. team defeat Canada, the Soviet Union, and Czechoslovakia and win the gold medal at Squaw Valley. For his efforts, he was named as the "All-World" goaltender of the Winter Games.

The New York Rangers gave him a four-game trial late in the 1959–60 season and he did quite well, the highlight being a save on Gordie Howe of the Detroit Red Wings. He had maintained his amateur status by not signing a contract with the Rangers. Instead, he acted on advice from his University of Minnesota hockey coach John Mariucci and was paid $1,000 a game with the hope that good performances would get him a contract worth more than the $7,000 National Hockey League (NHL) minimum. Attendance at Madison Square Garden for his four starts totaled 48,340 which was about 10,000 more than anticipated for a team that had been eliminated from playoff contention. After getting a win, two draws and a loss and stopping 92 of 99 shots on goal, McCartan signed with the Rangers for the following season for more than $10,000.

He could not duplicate his success in the NHL. Coach Alf Pike decided to alternate Gump Worsley and McCartan in 1960–61, but when McCartan gave up 36 goals in 7½ games, Worsley became the full-time goaltender and McCartan was demoted to the minors. He played for several minor league teams over the next several years. He played in the Eastern Professional League, Western League, Central League, and World Hockey Association. In the early 1970s he resurfaced when the Minnesota Fighting Saints of the World Hockey Association signed him, but he retired after two seasons.

He later scouted for the Vancouver Canucks.

Awards and honours

Named Best Goaltender at Olympic Games (1960) 
WHL Second All-Star Team (1969) 
WHL First All-Star Team (1970, 1971)

References

External links

1935 births
Living people
AHCA Division I men's ice hockey All-Americans
American men's ice hockey goaltenders
Baseball players at the 1959 Pan American Games
Baseball players from Saint Paul, Minnesota
Ice hockey people from Saint Paul, Minnesota
Ice hockey players at the 1960 Winter Olympics
IIHF Hall of Fame inductees
Los Angeles Blades (WHL) players
Medalists at the 1959 Pan American Games
Medalists at the 1960 Winter Olympics
Minnesota Fighting Saints players
Minnesota Golden Gophers baseball players
Minnesota Golden Gophers men's ice hockey players
Minnesota Rangers players
New York Rangers players
Olympic gold medalists for the United States in ice hockey
Omaha Knights (CHL) players
Pan American Games bronze medalists for the United States
Pan American Games medalists in baseball
San Diego Gulls (WHL) players
San Francisco Seals (ice hockey) players
St. Louis Braves players
Suncoast Suns (SHL) players
United States Army soldiers
United States Hockey Hall of Fame inductees
Vancouver Canucks scouts